In mathematics, more specifically in ring theory, a maximal ideal is an ideal that is maximal (with respect to set inclusion) amongst all proper ideals. In other words, I is a maximal ideal of a ring R if there are no other ideals contained between I and R.

Maximal ideals are important because the quotients of rings by maximal ideals are simple rings, and in the special case of unital commutative rings they are also fields.

In noncommutative ring theory, a maximal right ideal is defined analogously as being a maximal element in the poset of proper right ideals, and similarly, a maximal left ideal is defined to be a maximal element of the poset of proper left ideals.  Since a one sided maximal ideal A is not necessarily two-sided, the quotient R/A is not necessarily a ring, but it is a simple module over R.  If R has a unique maximal right ideal, then R is known as a local ring, and the maximal right ideal is also the unique maximal left and unique maximal two-sided ideal of the ring, and is in fact the Jacobson radical J(R).

It is possible for a ring to have a unique maximal two-sided ideal and yet lack unique maximal one sided ideals: for example, in the ring of 2 by 2 square matrices over a field, the zero ideal is a maximal two-sided ideal, but there are many maximal right ideals.

Definition
There are other equivalent ways of expressing the definition of maximal one-sided and maximal two-sided ideals. Given a ring R and a proper ideal I of R (that is I ≠ R), I is a maximal ideal of R if any of the following equivalent conditions hold:
 There exists no other proper ideal J of R so that I ⊊ J.
 For any ideal J with I ⊆ J, either J = I or J = R.
 The quotient ring R/I is a simple ring.
There is an analogous list for one-sided ideals, for which only the right-hand versions will be given. For a right ideal A of a ring R, the following conditions are equivalent to A being a maximal right ideal of R:
 There exists no other proper right ideal B of R so that A ⊊ B.
 For any right ideal B with A ⊆ B, either B = A or B = R.
 The quotient module R/A is a simple right R-module.

Maximal right/left/two-sided ideals are the dual notion to that of minimal ideals.

Examples
 If F is a field, then the only maximal ideal is {0}.
 In the ring Z of integers, the maximal ideals are the principal ideals generated by a prime number.
 More generally, all nonzero prime ideals are maximal in a principal ideal domain.
 The ideal  is a maximal ideal in ring .
 Every prime ideal is a maximal ideal in a Boolean ring, i.e., a ring consisting of only idempotent elements. In fact, every prime ideal is maximal in a commutative ring  whenever there exists an integer  such that  for any .
 More generally, the maximal ideals of the polynomial ring  over an algebraically closed field K are the ideals of the form . This result is known as the weak Nullstellensatz.

Properties
 An important ideal of the ring called the Jacobson radical can be defined using maximal right (or maximal left) ideals.
 If R is a unital commutative ring with an ideal m, then k = R/m is a field if and only if m is a maximal ideal. In that case, R/m is known as the residue field. This fact can fail in non-unital rings.
 If L is a maximal left ideal, then R/L is a simple left R-module.  Conversely in rings with unity, any simple left R-module arises this way.  Incidentally this shows that a collection of representatives of simple left R-modules is actually a set since it can be put into correspondence with part of the set of maximal left ideals of R.
 Krull's theorem (1929): Every nonzero unital ring has a maximal ideal.  The result is also true if "ideal" is replaced with "right ideal" or "left ideal".  More generally, it is true that every nonzero finitely generated module has a maximal submodule.   Suppose I is an ideal which is not R (respectively, A is a right ideal which is not R). Then R/I is a ring with unity (respectively, R/A is a finitely generated module), and so the above theorems can be applied to the quotient to conclude that there is a maximal ideal (respectively, maximal right ideal) of R containing I (respectively, A).
 Krull's theorem can fail for rings without unity. A radical ring, i.e. a ring in which the Jacobson radical is the entire ring, has no simple modules and hence has no maximal right or left ideals. See regular ideals for possible ways to circumvent this problem.
 In a commutative ring with unity, every maximal ideal is a prime ideal. The converse is not always true: for example, in any nonfield integral domain the zero ideal is a prime ideal which is not maximal.  Commutative rings in which prime ideals are maximal are known as zero-dimensional rings, where the dimension used is the Krull dimension. 
 A maximal ideal of a noncommutative ring might not be prime in the commutative sense. However, maximal ideals of noncommutative rings are prime in the generalized sense below.

Generalization
Equivalently, M is a maximal submodule if and only if the quotient module A/M is a simple module. The maximal right ideals of a ring R are exactly the maximal submodules of the module RR.

Unlike rings with unity, a nonzero module does not necessarily have maximal submodules. However, as noted above, finitely generated nonzero modules have maximal submodules, and also projective modules have maximal submodules.

As with rings, one can define the radical of a module using maximal submodules. Furthermore, maximal ideals can be generalized by defining a maximal sub-bimodule M of a bimodule B to be a proper sub-bimodule of M which is contained in no other proper sub-bimodule of M. The maximal ideals of R are then exactly the maximal sub-bimodules of the bimodule RRR.

See also
Prime ideal

References

Ideals (ring theory)
Ring theory
Prime ideals